Luo Shipeng (born 9 June 2000) is a Chinese footballer currently playing as a forward for Qingdao Youth Island on loan from Hebei China Fortune.

Club career
Luo Shipeng was promoted to the senior team of Hebei China Fortune within the 2020 Chinese Super League season and would make his debut in a league game on 5 September 2020 against Shanghai SIPG F.C. in a 2-0 victory.

Career statistics

References

External links

2000 births
Living people
Chinese footballers
China youth international footballers
Association football forwards
Chinese Super League players
Hebei F.C. players